A watchmaker is an artisan who makes and repairs watches. Since a majority of watches are now factory-made, most modern watchmakers only repair watches. However, originally they were master craftsmen who built watches, including all their parts, by hand. Modern watchmakers, when required to repair older watches, for which replacement parts may not be available, must have fabrication skills, and can typically manufacture replacements for many of the parts found in a watch. The term clockmaker refers to an equivalent occupation specializing in clocks.

Most practising professional watchmakers service current or recent production watches.  They seldom fabricate replacement parts. Instead they obtain and fit factory spare parts applicable to the watch brand being serviced. The majority of modern watchmakers, particularly in Switzerland and other countries in Europe, work directly for the watchmaking industry and may have completed a formal watchmaking degree at a technical school. They also receive in-house "brand" training at the factory or service center where they are employed. However, some factory service centers have an approach that allows them to use 'non-watchmakers' (called "opérateurs") who perform only one aspect of the repair process. These highly skilled workers do not have a watchmaking degree or certificate, but are specifically trained 'in-house' as technicians to service a small number of components of the watch in a true 'assembly-line' fashion, (e.g., one type of worker will dismantle the watch movement from the case, another will polish the case and bracelet, another will install the dial and hands, etc.). If genuine watchmakers are employed in such environments, they are usually employed to service the watch movement.

Due to factory/genuine spare parts restrictions, an increasing minority of watchmakers in the US are 'independent,' meaning that they choose not to work directly for industry or at a factory service center.  One major Swiss watch brand – Rolex – now pre-qualifies independent watchmakers before they provide them with spare parts.  This qualification may include, but is not limited to, holding a modern training certificate from one of several reputable schools; having a workshop environment that meets Rolex's standards for cleanliness; using modern equipment; and being a member of the American Watchmakers-Clockmakers Institute. The Omega brand has the same approach. However, the vast majority of modern Swiss brands do not sell parts to independent watchmakers, irrespective of the watchmaker's expertise, training or credentials. This industry policy is thought to enable Swiss manufacturers to maintain tighter quality control of the after-sales service for its watch brands, produce high margins on after sales services (two to four times what an independent watchmaker would ask), and to reduce the availability of second-hand watchmaking parts on the used and fake market.

Training

Historically, in England, watchmakers would have to undergo a seven-year apprenticeship and then join a guild, such as the Worshipful Company of Clockmakers in London, before selling their first watch. In modern times, watchmakers undergo training courses such as the ones offered by the BHI, or one of the many other schools around the world following the WOSTEP style curriculum. Some US watchmaking schools of horology will teach not only the Wostep style, including the ETA range of movements, but also focus on the older watches that a modern watchmaker will encounter on a daily basis. In Denmark the apprenticeship lasts four years, with six terms at the Danish School of Watchmaking in Ringsted. The education covers both clocks and watches, as a watchmaker in Denmark is also a clockmaker. In France, there are three diplomas: the lowest is the Certificat d'aptitude professionnelle (CAP) in horology (in two years), then the "Brevet des Métiers d'Art" horology for another two-year course. And optionally, the Diplôme des métiers d'art / DMA Horlogerie (two years).

Watchmaker as metaphor 

William Paley and others used the watchmaker in his famous analogy to imply the existence of God (the teleological argument) .

Richard Dawkins later applied this analogy in his book The Blind Watchmaker, arguing that evolution is blind in that it cannot look forward.

In popular culture
Alan Moore in his graphic novel Watchmen, uses the metaphor of the watchmaker as a central part of the backstory of his heroic character Dr. Manhattan.

In the NBC television series Heroes, the villain Sylar is a watchmaker by trade. His ability to know how watches work corresponds to his ability to gain new superpowers by examining the brains of people he has murdered.

In the scifi novel The Mote in God's Eye by Larry Niven, the Watchmakers are a small technologically intelligent sub-species of the Moties that will repair/improve things left for them (accompanied by food as payment).

In the 2015 major motion picture film Survivor directed by James McTeigue, one of the world's most wanted killers is played by Pierce Brosnan, who demonstrates just how devastating the precision skill sets of a watchmaker can be as he plays the role of 'Nash,' a professional killer who excels at bomb making and long-range shooting.

References

Notable watchmakers 

 Stefan Anderson
 Ferdinand Berthoud
 Abraham Louis Breguet
 Louis Cartier
 George Daniels
 John Harrison
 Peter Henlein
 Christiaan Huygens
 Antide Janvier
 Jean-Antoine Lépine
 Thomas Mudge
 Russell Powell
 Nicolas Mathieu Rieussec
 
 Thomas Tompion
 Gérald Genta

See also 

 Chronometer watch
 Clockmaker
 Federation of the Swiss Watch Industry FH
 History of timekeeping devices
 Marine chronometer
 National Association of Watch and Clock Collectors
 Perlée or pearl pattern
 Watch

Further reading

External links 

 Federation of the Swiss Watch Industry FH
 American Watchmakers-Clockmakers Institute
 British Horological Institute
 Institute of Swiss Watchmaking
 AFAHA - Association française des amateurs d'horlogerie ancienne
 ANCAHA - Association nationale des collectionneurs et amateurs d'horlogerie ancienne et d'art
 Association horlogerie comtoise
 Swiss watch industry denies 'Nokia moment' from new Apple Watch 

 
Crafts

es:Relojero